Kundapura railway station is a station on Konkan Railway Which connects the Kundapur City to other cities of the country like New Delhi, Mumbai, Bengaluru, Mysore, Chennai,Trivandrum, Cochin etc. This station connects between two city Udupi and Bhatkal.
It's pilgrim important railway station connects Kollur Mookambika Temple and Aanegudde Vinayaka temple .
It's very much used by Kerala pilgrims as this station makes pilgrim reach Kollur faster than any other stations.
It is at a distance of  down from origin. The preceding station on the line is Senapura railway station and the next station is Barkur railway station.

References 

Railway stations along Konkan Railway line
Railway stations in Udupi district
Karwar railway division